Drew Starkey is an American actor. He portrays Garrett Laughlin in the Simonverse films Love, Simon and The Hate U Give, Rafe Cameron in the Netflix teen drama series Outer Banks and Hawkins in the VH1 series Scream: Resurrection.

Early life
Starkey attended St. Stephens High School in Hickory, North Carolina, and Western Carolina University.

Filmography

Film

Television

References

External links
 

Living people
American actors
Male actors from North Carolina
Actors from North Carolina
People from North Carolina
1993 births